Chalabi (also Romanized as Chalabī) is a village in Sanjabi Rural District, Kuzaran District, Kermanshah County, Kermanshah Province, Iran. At the 2006 census, its population was 18, in 4 families.

References 

Populated places in Kermanshah County